Deborah Warren (born 1946, in Boston) is an American author.

She graduated from Harvard University, with a BA in English. 
She worked as a teacher of Latin and English, and as a software engineering manager.
She lives in Massachusetts with her husband.

Publications

Her work has appeared in The New Yorker, The Paris Review, Poetry, and The Yale Review.

Her books include:
The Size of Happiness, Waywiser Press, 2003, 
Zero Meridian: poems, Ivan R. Dee, 2004, 
Dream with Flowers and Bowl of Fruit, University of Evansville Press, 2008, 
Ausonius: Moselle, Epigrams, and Other Poems, Routledge, 2016, 
Strange to Say: Etymology for Serious Entertainment, Paul Dry, 2021
Connoisseurs of Worms, Paul Dry, 2021

Awards
 2000 Robert Penn Warren Prize
 2000 T. S. Eliot Prize of Truman State University (finalist)
 2001 Howard Nemerov Sonnet Award
 2002 Robert Frost Award
 2003 New Criterion Poetry Prize
 2008 Richard Wilbur Award for publication of Dream with Flowers and Bowl of Fruit
 2018 Meringoff Award

References

External links
"Airplane", Paris Review, Macmillan, 2004, 
"Dream with Flowers and Bowl of Fruit", The New Yorker, October 1, 2007
"Deborah Warren", poemtree

1946 births
Writers from Boston
Harvard College alumni
Living people
American women poets
American women farmers
American women engineers
Engineers from Massachusetts
21st-century women engineers
21st-century American women writers